Tianjian Lucas Ogawa Yan (born 20 April 2005), known as Lucas Yan, is a former Hong Kong professional footballer of partial Japanese descent who plays as a forward for Lucky Mile.

Career statistics

Club

Notes

References

External links
 Yau Yee Football League profile

Living people
2005 births
People from Minato
Association football people from Tokyo
Hong Kong people of Japanese descent
Hong Kong footballers
Hong Kong youth international footballers
Japanese footballers
Association football forwards
Hong Kong Premier League players
Hong Kong FC players